To err is human may refer to: 

 "To err is human, to forgive divine" a quote from Alexander Pope's poem An Essay on Criticism
 Errare humanum est, a Latin proverb
 To Err Is Human (report), a 1999 report on U.S. medical errors